Ukrainian Venezuelans are Venezuelans of Ukrainian heritage. The Ukrainian diaspora increased after 1945 due to a second wave of political emigrants. In the latter half of the 1940s and early 1950s, these Ukrainians were resettled in many different countries creating new Ukrainian settlements in Australia and Venezuela. In Venezuela the population is estimated to be around 10,000 Ukrainians.

Notable people
 Ivan Belsky (1923-2003), painter and graphic artist.
 Lya Imber, (Odessa, Ukraine, 1914 - Caracas, 1981), the first woman in Venezuela to obtain the degree of Doctor of Medicine (Paediatrics & Child Care Specialist) and the first female member of the board of the Medical School of the Federal District.
 Sofia Imber, journalist.
 , botanist and university professor.
 Stefanía Fernández Krupij, beauty pageant titleholder who won the Miss Venezuela 2008 and Miss Universe 2009 titles. She earned a Guinness record by being the first Miss Universe winner who was crowned by a compatriot.
 Vasyl Krychevsky, was a painter, architect, art scholar, graphic artist, and master of applied art and decorative art.

See also 
 Ukraine–Venezuela relations
 Ukrainian diaspora

References

European Venezuelan
Venezuela